Topelius may refer to:

Topelius, Minnesota
Topelius (surname)